Charles Pinder was an Anglican  priest in the  20th century.

He was born on 5 May 1921, educated at Selwyn College, Cambridge, and King's College London (AKC), and ordained in 1951. After a curacy at St Saviour's Raynes Park he was the vicar of  All Saints' Hatcham Park then St Laurence's Catford. He was the sub dean of Lewisham then the borough dean of Lambeth from 1973 to 1986. He died on 2 April 1999.

Notes

1921 births
Alumni of King's College London
Associates of King's College London
Archdeacons of Lambeth
1999 deaths